Leah Gazan  (born April 8, 1972) is a Canadian politician who was elected to represent the riding of Winnipeg Centre in the House of Commons of Canada in the 2019 Canadian federal election.

Early life
Leah Gazan was born in Thompson, Manitoba to Albert and Marjorie Gazan. Gazan is Lakota-Chinese on her mother's side, and Jewish on her father's side. Gazan's father, Albert Gazan,  is a Holocaust survivor from the Netherlands, born in The Hague, South Holland in 1938. Both of her parents were organizers for the Co-operative Commonwealth Federation, the NDP's predecessor party.

Before her first political campaign, Gazan taught at the University of Winnipeg. She also served as president for the Social Planning council of Winnipeg. Gazan participated in Idle No More, and pushed for Bill C-262 to be passed by the House of Commons. She also represented the province of Manitoba for the United Nations Permanent Forum on Indigenous Issues advocating for acknowledgement of injustice perpetuated against Indigenous Canadian adoptive children.

Political career
Gazan identifies as a socialist, like her parents. In 2019, Gazan won the NDP nomination for Winnipeg Centre over former Manitoba Attorney General Andrew Swan. She subsequently defeated incumbent Liberal Robert-Falcon Ouellette, another Indigenous candidate, for the seat of Winnipeg Centre, retaking the district for the NDP.

During the 43rd Canadian Parliament, NDP leader Jagmeet Singh appointed Gazan to be the Critic for Families, Children, and Social Development in the NDP's shadow Cabinet. She introduced one private member's bill, Bill C-323, An Act respecting a Climate Emergency Action Framework, which sought to require the Minister of the Environment to develop and implement a framework on achieving the objectives of the United Nations Framework Convention on Climate Change. At a vote on March 24, 2021, it was defeated with Liberal and Conservative Party MPs voting against.

In August 2020, Gazan introduced Motion 46 in the House of Commons of Canada, which would convert the Canada Emergency Response Benefit introduced by the federal government during the COVID-19 pandemic into a permanent basic income program. In 2021 she spoke in the House of Commons in support of UBI.

Electoral record

References

External links

Canadian politicians of Chinese descent
Canadian people of Dutch-Jewish descent
Living people
First Nations politicians
New Democratic Party MPs
Members of the House of Commons of Canada from Manitoba
People from Thompson, Manitoba
Politicians from Winnipeg
Women members of the House of Commons of Canada
Indigenous Members of the House of Commons of Canada
Lakota people
21st-century Canadian politicians
21st-century Canadian women politicians
Year of birth uncertain
Canadian socialists
1972 births